Radzewo may refer to the following places:
Radzewo, Greater Poland Voivodeship (west-central Poland)
Radzewo, Białogard County in West Pomeranian Voivodeship (north-west Poland)
Radzewo, Szczecinek County in West Pomeranian Voivodeship (north-west Poland)